ClearOS (also known as the ClearOS System, formerly ClarkConnect) is a Linux distribution by ClearFoundation, with network gateway, file, print, mail, and messaging services.

History 
ClearOS is based on CentOS and Red Hat Enterprise Linux, designed for use in small and medium enterprises as a network gateway and network server with a web-based administration interface. It is positioned as an alternative to Windows Small Business Server. ClearOS is the successor to ClarkConnect. The software is built by ClearFoundation, and support services can be purchased from ClearCenter. ClearOS 5.1 removes previous limitations to mail, DMZ, and MultiWAN functions.

As of the ClearOS 6.1 release, the distribution is a full-featured operating system for gateway, network and servers built from source packages for Red Hat Enterprise Linux. 

ClearOS aims to replace, as a small business server, Windows SBS.

Features 
Features include:

 Stateful firewall (iptables), networking and security
 Intrusion detection and prevention system (SNORT)
 Virtual private networking (IPsec, PPTP, OpenVPN)
 Web proxy, with content filtering and antivirus (Squid, DansGuardian)
 E-mail services (Webmail, Postfix, SMTP, POP3/s, IMAP/s)
 Groupware (Kolab)
 Database and web server (easy to deploy LAMP stack)
 File and print services (Samba and CUPS)
 Flexshares (unified multi-protocol storage which currently employs SMB, HTTP/S, FTP/S, and SMTP)
 MultiWAN (Internet fault tolerant design)
 Built-in reports for system statistics and services (MRTG and others)

Awards and recognition 
August 2009: CompTIA Breakaway — ClearCenter's ClearOS wins 'Best New Product' at CompTIA Breakaway.
August 2010: CompTIA Breakaway — ClearCenter's ClearOS repeats win for 'Best New Product' at CompTIA Breakaway.
July 2012: Softpedia — An Open Source, free and powerful network and gateway Linux server operating system
February 2014: IDG Security Firewall Distributions Review
June 2015: Small Business Computing — The 5 Best Linux Servers for Small Business
September 2015: LinuxVoice Service Distro — Group Test (see pages 58-63)

See also

 Windows SBS
 ClarkConnect
 SmoothWall
 m0n0wall
 SME Server
 Zentyal
 ClearFoundation

References

External links 
 
 
 Clark Connect at DistroWatch
 clarkconnect.com
 clarkconnect.org recycle a tired old computer into an Internet gateway
 PointClark Networks
 ClarkConnect becomes ClearOS
 ClearFoundation
 ClearCenter

Enterprise Linux distributions
Firewall software
Free routing software
Gateway/routing/firewall distribution
Linux distributions